Slovaks are one of the recognized autochthonous minorities of Croatia. According to 2011 census, there were 4,753 Slovaks in the country.

History

Slovaks mainly migrated to Croatia in the 19th century, and to a much lesser extent in the 20th century. Many were peasants from the poverty-stricken region of Kysuce in northwestern Slovakia. 

Several notable Croatians are of Slovak descent, including philologist cardinal Juraj Haulik, Bogoslav Šulek and writer August Šenoa.

Slovaks are officially recognized as an autochthonous national minority, and as such, together with the Czechs of Croatia, elect a special representative to the Croatian Parliament.

Geographic representation
Most Croatian Slovaks live in the region of Slavonia, with the majority residing in the Osijek-Baranja and the Vukovar-Syrmia counties.

The following were reported as settlements with a significant Slovak minority, as of the 2001 census.

Towns:
Ilok, 1,044 (12.5%)
Našice, 964 (5.57%)

Municipalities:
Punitovci 658 (35.57%)
Lipovljani, 123 (3%) 
Vrbanja, 72 (1.39%)
Koška, 50 (1.13%)
Drenje, 34 (1.1%)

Villages:
Jelisavac by Našice
Jurjevac Punitovački by Punitovci
Markovac 
Soljani

, Slovak language is officially used in one municipality and one other settlement in Croatia, according to the European Charter for Regional or Minority Languages.

Culture
The Union of Slovaks was established in 1992 and focused on preserving Slovak culture and language, along with the creation of its magazine, Prameň. In 1998 the Central Library of Slovaks in the Republic of Croatia was founded. In Ilok, the Cultural Society of Ljudevit Štur (KUD Ljudevit Štur).

Notable people

Ljudevit Gaj (1809–1872), linguist
Slavoljub Eduard Penkala (1871-1922), engineer and inventor
August Šenoa (1838-1881), novelist
Domagoj Vida (born 1989), football player

See also 
 Croatia–Slovakia relations
 Slovaks in Ilok
 Slovaks in Soljani

References

External links
 Union of Slovaks in the Republic of Croatia

Ethnic groups in Croatia
Croatia
Slovak diaspora